Borabue is a district (amphoe) in the central part of Maha Sarakham province, northeastern Thailand.

Geography 
Neighboring districts are (from the north clockwise): Kosum Phisai, Mueang Maha Sarakham, Wapi Pathum, Na Chueak, and Kut Rang.

History 
In 1897 the district was established, then named Patchim Sarakham (ปจิมสารคาม). In 1913 it was renamed Thakhon Yang (ท่าขรยาง). In 1914 the governor of Maha Sarakham granted the new name Borabue (at first spelled บ่อระบือ, later shortened to บรบือ).

Administration 
The district is divided into 15 sub-districts (tambons), which are further subdivided into 203 villages (mubans). Borabue is a sub-district municipality (thesaban tambon) which covers parts of tambon Borabue. There are a further 15 tambon administrative organizations (TAO).

Missing numbers are tambons which now form Kut Rang District.

References

External links
amphoe.com (Thai)

Borabue